Li Liping (born ) is a Chinese female Paralympic sitting volleyball player. She is part of the China women's national sitting volleyball team.

She competed at the  2004 Summer Paralympics, 2012 Summer Paralympics winning the gold medal, and the 2016 Paralympic Games, winning the silver medal.
On club level she played for Shanghai in 2012.

See also
 China at the 2012 Summer Paralympics

References

External links

1982 births
Living people
Volleyball players at the 2012 Summer Paralympics
Paralympic competitors for China
Chinese women's volleyball players
Women's sitting volleyball players
Medalists at the 2008 Summer Paralympics
Chinese sitting volleyball players
Medalists at the 2004 Summer Paralympics
Medalists at the 2012 Summer Paralympics
Medalists at the 2016 Summer Paralympics
Paralympic medalists in volleyball
Paralympic gold medalists for China
Paralympic silver medalists for China
21st-century Chinese women